Mahamaham, also known as Mahamagham or Mamangam, is a Hindu festival celebrated every 12 years in the Mahamaham tank located in the city of Kumbakonam in Tamil Nadu in the south of India. This 20-acre square tank surrounded by Shiva mandapams is believed by Tamil Hindus to be ancient, and the holy confluence of nine Indian river goddesses: Ganga, Yamuna, Sarasvati, Narmada, Godavari, Krishna, Tungabhadra, Kaveri, and Sarayu, states Diana Eck – a professor of Comparative Religion and Indian Studies. On the day of the Mahamaham festival, the river goddesses and Shiva gather here to rejuvenate their waters, according to a legend in the Periya Purana. The Hindus consider taking a pilgrimage and holy dip at the Mahamaham tirtha on the day of Mahamaham festival as sacred. The event attracts chariot processions, street fairs and classical dance performances in temple mandapas. The 12-year cycle Mahamaham festival in Tamil Nadu is observed in the Hindu calendar month of Magha, and is a symbolic equivalent of the Kumbh Mela.

The Mahamaham festival – also referred to as the Maha Magam festival – and the holy dip tradition of the South Indian Hindus was documented by the British colonial era writers in the 19th-century. The last Mahamaham was celebrated on 22 February 2016 with over a million people from various places taking the holy dip in the Mahamaham tank. The festival with its dip-in-the-tank-waters tradition extends over 10 days (Brahmothsavam). The 10-day festivities are also observed with lesser crowds in the Magha month (about February) every year between the 12-year Maha (major) cycle. In the interim years, the event is called the Masi-maham festival.

Legend

The Mahamaham tank is surrounded by small temple mandapas with Vedic and Puranic deities, each with a Shiva linga in the sanctum. It also features the big Kashi Vishwanathar temple to its north. At the entrance temple gate, there is the image of Shiva with nine Indian river goddesses: Ganga, Yamuna, Sarasvati, Narmada, Godavari, Krishna, Tungabhadra, Kaveri, and Sarayu. Portions of the Periya Purana are inscribed inside the mandapas and the temple. The complete legend is found on the inner walls of the Kumbheshvara temple near the water pool. According to this legend, after the end of each cyclic existence, there is a Mahapralaya (great flood) when Shiva helped save all creation by floating all seeds of creation and amritam (nectar of immortality) in a pot (kumbha). The flood subsided and the pot came to rest on ground, which was broken by an arrow by Shiva in a hunter form. This spilled the contents into a large pool that became the Mahamaham tank. Another legend is painted pictorially. This shows Brahma being instructed by Shiva to preserve all seeds of creation and life forms in a giant kumbha (pot) during a great flood. It floats to Meru, survives the floods, and when the floods end the pot comes to rest near the banks of Kaveri river in a place now called Kumbhakonam. Shiva, in the form of Kiratamoorty (hunter) breaks it and the water inside the pot becomes the Mahamaham tank. The coconut on top of the pot breaks and becomes the lingas. The pot parts were memorialized by the many mandapa and temples near the tank and the Kumbhakunam region: Kumbeswara, Someswara, Kasi Viswanatha, Nageswara, Kamata Viswanatha, Abimukeshwara, Goutameswara, Banapuriswara, Varahar, Lakshminaryana, Sarangapani, Chakrapani and Varadharaja.

Astronomically, Maha maham or magha festival is celebrated in the month when full moon occurs as moon is passing Magha nakshatra (Leo sign) and Sun is on the other end in the opposite Aquarius sign (Kumnha Rasi). Mahamagham occurs once in twelve years when the planet Jupiter's residence in Leo coincides with full-moon in Leo. On the day of the festival in the month of Magha, it is believed to bring all water bodies together and water is rejuvenated.

History
The antiquity of the event is deduced from the architectural and epigraphy. The visit of Krishnadevaraya (1509-1529) is recorded in an inscription in the gopuram of Nagalpuram, a village in Chengalpattu district. That Krishnadevaraya visited the event is also recorded in the inscription found in the Shiva temple in Kuthalam. The ceiling of the Gangatirtha mandapam carries the sculptural representation of Tulapurushardava. It is believed that the 16th-century Nayak era prime minister Govinda Dikshitar attended the event and donated gold which help build the sixteen mandapas.

The tank is significant particularly to the South Indian Hindus. The festival is a symbolic equivalent to the Kumbh Mela pilgrimage at Prayaga in Uttar Pradesh.

The Festival

The Masimaham is an annual event that occurs in Kumbakonam in the Tamil month of Masi (February–March) in the star of Magam.  Vast crowds of Hindu devotees gather at Kumbakonam to have a dip in the tank.  All the rivers of India are believed to meet at the tank on this day and a purificatory bath at this tank on this day is considered equal to the combined dips in all the holy rivers of India   Festival deities from all the temples in Kumbakonam arrive at the tank and at noon, all the deities bathe along with the devotees - it is called "Theerthavari".  The purificatory bath is believed to remove sins and after the dip, pilgrims offer charitable gifts in the hope of being rewarded in the current life and subsequent lives. The temple cars of major temples in Kumbakonam come around the city on the festival night.  During the Mahamaham of 1992, the number of devotees were estimated to be one million.

During the time of Mahamaham festival, it is believed that the famous Indian river goddesses Ganges, Yamuna, Sarasvati River, Sarayu, Godavari River, Tungabhadra River (alternately Mahanadi River), Narmada River, Krishna River, and Kaveri River. These arrive here to rejuvenate and get repurified through Ganga and with Shiva's blessing. This cyclic event makes this a sacred site and the waters holy to cleanse one of any sins they may have committed or absorbed from others. which are mixed together in Mahamaham tank, would get rid of sins. The images of the deities indicating the legend, is housed in the nearby Kasi Viswanatha Temple.

In the northern bank mandapa, there is an inscription of Tulapurshadana, a practise of weighing oneself against gold. The ceremony is observed during various times like equinoxes, commencement of an era (Yuga) and its ending, eclipses and Makara Sankranti. The ceremony is usually performed in sacred places like temples, rivers and tanks. The amount of gold thus weighed is distributed among deserving men.

The Tank

The Tank is located in the heart of Kumbakonam city which is near the Kaveri river. The tank and temple premises spread over 20 acres, while the water pool with ghat-like steps covers an area of over 6 acres. It is square in its original design, but infrastructure upgrades and extensions have made it somewhat trapezoidal in shape. The tank is surrounded by 16 small Mandapams (shrines) and has 21 wells inside the tank.  The names of the wells carry the name of Lord Shiva or that of Rivers of India. Govinda Dikshitar, the chieftain of Ragunatha Nayak of Thanjavur, constructed the sixteen Mandapams and stone steps around this tank.

The Mahamaham Tank has four streets along its four banks. It is constructed with steps on the sides for people to easily access the tank and take dips. There are  16 Mandapas ( Gopuram Towers) around the corners and sides of the tank. These towers are considered to be forms of Shiva.

Names of the Gopuram Tower

1.Brammatheertheshwarar
2.Mukundeshwarar
3.Dhaneshwarar
4.Virushabeshwarar
5.Baaneshwarar
6.Koneshwarar
7.Bhakthikeshwarar
8.Bhairaveshwarar
9.Agasthyeshwarar
10.Vyaneshwarar
11.Umaibakeshwarar
12.Nairutheeshwarar
13.Brammeshwarar
14.Gangatheshwarar
15.Mukthatheertheshwarar
16.Shethrabaleshwarar

Names of 20 Theertham (wells)
1.Vayu Theertham
2.Ganga Theertham
3.Bramma Theertham
4.Yamuna Theertham
5.Kubera Theertham
6. Godavari Theertham
7.Eshana Theertham
8.Narmada Theertham
9.Saraswathi Theertham
10.Indira Theertham
11.Agni Theertham
12.Cauvery Theertham
13.Yama Theertham
14.Kumari Theertham
15.Niruthi Theertham
16.Bayoshni Theertham
17.Deva Theertham
18.Varunai Theertham
19.Sarayu Theertham
20.Kanya Theertham

Mahamaham festival rituals

On the Mahamaham day people start with praying these Siva temples, followed by a dip in the holy tank. The devouts follow a more exhaustive procedure with dips in the 20 wells, visit to Kumbeswarar Temple, dip in the holy tank and finally in Kaveri river to complete the process. Other celebrations including public chariot parades and fares, featuring the sanctum idols of the main temples of Kumbakonam being brought out for public viewing, carried in wooden chariots through the different streets of the town.

Connected Shiva Temples
Twelve Shiva temples are connected with Mahamaham festival which happens once in 12 years in Kumbakonam. They are Kasi Viswanathar Temple, Kumbeswarar Temple, Someswarar Temple, Nageswara Temple, Ekambareswarar Temple, Gowthameswarar Temple, Abimukeswarar Temple, Kambatta Visvanathar Temple, Banapuriswarar Temple, Kalahasteeswarar Temple, Koteeswarar Temple, and Amirthakalasanathar Temple. Of these twelve, first ten temples are located in Kumbakonam town itself. Of them 10 temples are in Kumbakonam.

Connected Vishnu Temples
Five Vishnu temples are connected with this festival. They are Sarangapani Temple, Chakrapani Temple, Ramaswamy Temple, Rajagopalaswamy Temple, and Varahaperumal Temple. All these temples are in Kumbakonam.

See also
Mahamaham Stampede
Mamankam (Tirunavaya, Kerala)

References

Dictionary of Hindu Lore and Legend by Anna Dallapiccola
 

 .

External links

Mahamaham 2016 Celebrations
Mahamaham festival

Hindu holy days
Religious festivals in India
Hindu festivals
Festivals in Tamil Nadu
Hinduism in Tamil Nadu
Kumbakonam